Tarp (also ) is a municipality in the district of Schleswig-Flensburg, in Schleswig-Holstein, Germany within the county Kreis Schleswig-Flensburg.

It is situated about 18 km south of Flensburg.

References

Schleswig-Flensburg